The feudal barony of Great Torrington whose caput was Great Torrington Castle in Devonshire, was one of eight feudal baronies in Devonshire which existed during the mediaeval era.

Sources
Sanders, I.J. English Baronies: A Study of their Origin and Descent 1086–1327, Oxford, 1960, pp. 48–9, Great Torrington
Pole, Sir William (d.1635), Collections Towards a Description of the County of Devon, Sir John-William de la Pole (ed.), London, 1791, pp. 20–1, Torinton
Risdon, Tristram (d.1640), Survey of Devon, 1811 edition, London, 1811, with 1810 Additions, p. 362, The Baronies of this County, etc.,

References

Feudal baronies in Devon
Great Torrington